Isaac S. D. Sassoon is an observant Sephardic rabbi  (hakham), scholar and educator.  Hakham Sassoon, who is currently one of the leading scholars in the Sephardic world, was born into the Sassoon family of London.

Biography
His initial education was under the tutelage of his father, the renowned scholar Rabbi Solomon David Sassoon, Hakham Yosef Doury, and others.  Later studies were at the prestigious Gateshead Yeshiva and various yeshivoth in Israel.  He holds a Ph.D. in Literature from the University of Lisbon.

Continuing his family's tradition of academic achievement, Hakham Sassoon has published on topics ranging from Scriptural commentary and history, to issues of current concern to the Jewish community .  Hakham Sassoon teaches at the Institute of Traditional Judaism-The Metivta and lectures widely.

Highly esteemed in the Sephardic community, Hakham Sassoon has contributed to the maintenance of the heritage of the Babylonian Jewish community  and has provided the Syrian Jewish community with an updated and corrected siddur (Jewish prayer book) reflecting that community's traditions.

He has recently published a book called "The Status of Women in Jewish Tradition" addressing the particular religious tradition's outlook on women.  He primarily refers to the Torah, Talmud, and Dead Sea Scrolls in exploring the authentic position on the "continuum of patriarchal condescension." His goal, in writing the book, was to give authentic answers to a popular 
(if not hackneyed) question.

Selected works
The Status of Women in Jewish Tradition, Cambridge University Press (2011)
Destination Torah: Notes and Reflections on Selected Verses from the Weekly Torah Readings, a commentary on the Pentateuch on the light of critical studies (Hebrew language edition Ve-ha'arev Na),  
Uriel da Costa, Examination of Pharisaic Traditions, ed. and trans. with Herman Prins Salomon, Brill, Leiden, (1993) [orig. ed. Amsterdam, 1623]
The Marrano Factory: The Portuguese Inquisition and Its New Christians 1536-1765, Antonio Jose Sariava (Author), Herman Prins Salomon (Translator), I. S. D. Sassoon (Translator), Leiden, 2001. 
Siddur Ve-ha'arev Na (2007), a prayerbook according to the Syrian nusach.
"Siddur עָלַץ לִבִּי"

Articles
The Relevance for Today of Uriel Da Costa's 'Examination of Pharisaic Traditions' , Studia Rosenthaliana, vol. 28, no. 1 (1994)
Et Lirpoh (A Time to Heal), Hadoar, vol. 82, no. 4 (2004).
Review essay  on Agunot entitled Ra'ah Ma'aseh Ve'Nizkar Halakhah, Judaism, vol. 54, nos. 1-2 (2005)

References

External links

English religious writers
Sephardi rabbis
British Orthodox rabbis
Living people
Isaac
Year of birth missing (living people)
British people of Indian-Jewish descent
Baghdadi Jews
British writers of Indian descent
Union for Traditional Judaism